Mangesh Ramesh Chavan is an Indian politician. He was elected to the Maharashtra Legislative Assembly from Chalisgaon in the 2019 Maharashtra Legislative Assembly election as a member of Bharatiya Janata Party.

References 

1983 births
Living people
Bharatiya Janata Party politicians from Maharashtra
People from Jalgaon district
Maharashtra MLAs 2019–2024